The Little Red Songbook is the twelfth studio album by Scottish musician Momus, released by Le Grand Magistery in 1998. Momus describes the album's style as part of his "analog baroque" phase: "an odd blend of classicism and kitschy futurism." The album features a number of karaoke versions of the songs that were used for a singing contest; the winners of the contest appear on the album Stars Forever.

The title was inspired by the controversial Danish book The Little Red Schoolbook.

Lawsuit
The original release of The Little Red Songbook contained the song "Walter Carlos", which postulated that, when time travel becomes possible, transgender musician Wendy Carlos could go back in time and marry Walter Carlos, Carlos's pre-transition identity. In 1998, Wendy Carlos sued Momus for $22 million over the song. The case was settled out of court, with Momus agreeing to remove it from the album and owing $30,000 in legal fees. Subsequent releases of the album do not include the song. Momus fundraised the money needed to pay the fees in a novel manner. The first 30 songs on his next album Stars Forever (all of disc one and part of disc two) are songs commissioned by a person or group who paid him $1,000 to write and record a song about themselves. Meaning after 30 songs, Momus raised the $30,000 needed.

Track listing

References

Momus (musician) albums
1998 albums